Adrian Ioan Drida (born 5 January 1982 in Sântana) is a Romanian former football player who played as a midfielder.

Club career

Drida started his career playing for UTA Arad, from where he was also loaned to Motorul CFR Arad and Romvest Arad and in 2004 he is signed by Jiul Petroşani.

A new transfer, this time to Steaua Bucharest, his favourite team in football, followed in 2006. However, Drida failed to impress coach Cosmin Olăroiu and he is loaned back to his former club during the 2006–07 season.

Politehnica Iasi

In June 2010 he joined Politehnica Iași but after only one season, he was transferred to FC Milsami, in Moldova.

External links
 
 

1982 births
Living people
People from Sântana
Romanian footballers
Association football midfielders
Liga I players
Liga II players
FC UTA Arad players
CSM Jiul Petroșani players
FC Politehnica Iași (2010) players